Countervailing power, or countervailance, is the idea in political theory of institutionalized mechanisms that the wielding of power within a polity having two or more centers can, and often does, provide counter-forces that usefully oppose each other. 

Countervailance in formal political theory dates back at least to Medieval times, especially in Roman Catholic and early Protestant movements, not all of which were successful in achieving their own ends.
The Conciliar Movement, although ultimately ending in failure to reform the Catholic church, "raised issues that are fundamental in all domains of social organization, and it contributed to the understanding of the general principle of countervailance, which eventually became the foundation of modern constitutionalism."

This political organization stands in contrast to polities such as principalities where "various princes were absolute rulers in their domain" or in modern examples of totalitarian governments.

In the 20th century, "Countervailing Power" is a theory of political modification of markets, formulated by American economist John Kenneth Galbraith in his 1952 book American Capitalism.  In the classic liberal economy, goods and services are provided and prices set by free bargaining.  According to Galbraith, modern economies give massive powers to large business corporations to bias this process, and there arise 'countervailing' powers in the form of trade unions, citizens' organizations and so on, to offset business's excessive advantage. On page 126 of this book, Galbraith elaborates on countervailing power in the sphere of economics when he states:"The development of countervailing power requires a certain minimum opportunity and capacity for organization, corporate or otherwise. If the large retail buying organizations had not developed the countervailing power which they have used, by proxy, on behalf of the individual consumer, consumers would have been faced with the need to organize the equivalent of the retailer's power. This would have been a formidable task but it has been accomplished in Scandinavia where the consumer's co-operative, instead of the chain store, is the dominant instrument of countervailing power in consumers' goods markets."

Seventeenth century England was an active time for the development of countervailance theory.  Although much political discourse during the period was focused on the matter of sovereignty, or absolutism for the sovereign as, for example, we observe in the writings of Thomas Hobbes, the principle "significance of seventeenth-century England for constitutional theory was that during this period the concept of sovereignty was replaced by the concept of checks and balances."
The evolution of political practice in England paralleled the evolution in theory, for it was during this period that "the operational dynamics of the system developed in accordance with the countervailance model of government."
While the trend reversed somewhat under the power of Oliver Cromwell and the era of the later Stuarts, and was therefore rather uneven over the flow of the 17th century, the Glorious Revolution of 1688 "firmly established the principles of dispersed power and checks and balances as the central pillars of English constitutionalism."

See also 
 Separation of powers

References

Political theories